James Hare (1747–1804) was an English politician, diplomat and wit.

Life
He was the son of Joseph Hare, an apothecary of Wells, Somerset. He was educated at Eton College, and entered King's College, Cambridge in December 1765. He graduated B.A. in 1770, having become a fellow in 1768, a position he held to 1774.

Hare entered London life, where his status as a wit was generally recognised. Georgiana Cavendish, Duchess of Devonshire described Hare as having "a manner of placing every object in so new a light that his kind of wit always surprises as much as it pleases." He associated with the fashionable set of Frederick Howard, 5th Earl of Carlisle, Earl Fitzwilliam, General Richard FitzPatrick, Charles James Fox, and Anthony Morris Storer. He  broke down in his maiden parliamentary speech, and never made a second attempt. 

One of the few trustworthy and discreet members of the Ton (le bon ton), Hare was a loyal, kind friend to Georgiana Cavendish, Duchess of Devonshire to his death. For example, Hare had several illegitimate children of his own, and was sympathetic to the plight of Georgiana's friend Lady Elizabeth Foster's illegitimate children; he went out of his way to check on Foster's illegitimate children in France in the midst of the French Revolution. Hare brushed off his kindness, writing to Foster, "The constant anxiety which I feel for my own children would of itself sufficiently dispose me to assist almost anybody when children are concerned." He helped convince Georgiana to allow Foster's illegitimate daughter Caroline St. Jules to publicly become a member of the family by allowing her to live at Devonshire House.

Of his physical appearance, he was "stick-thin, with a face so white he appeared more dead than alive." 

Hare was a gambling addict, and he was always in debt. His seat in Parliament —courtesy of the Duke of Devonshire— was the only reason he was not sent to debtors' prison. While his grandfather was a bishop, his father was a mere apothecary. Hare had gambled away his small inheritance and thereafter remained dependent on his rich Whig friends as a house guest.

From October 1779 to January 1782 he was minister plenipotentiary in Poland. 

In 1802 he was very ill in Paris, and Fox paid him frequent visits. After taking a stroll with Georgiana's mother Georgiana Spencer, Countess Spencer, he caught a head-cold that turned into pneumonia; he died at Bath, Somerset 10 March 1804. Hare was greatly mourned by his friends, including Georgiana, the Duke of Devonshire, and Bess Foster.

Works
Hare was believed to have been one of the writers of the Rolliad.

Family
Hare's fortune was improved by his marriage at St. George's, Hanover Square, London, on 21 January 1774, to Hannah, only daughter of Sir Abraham Hume, 1st Baronet. She died 6 May 1827, and a monument to her memory was placed in the chancel of Wormley Church, Hertfordshire. They had one daughter.

Notes

Attribution

1747 births
1804 deaths
People educated at Eton College
Members of the Parliament of Great Britain for English constituencies
Members of the Parliament of the United Kingdom for English constituencies
Fellows of King's College, Cambridge
British MPs 1768–1774
British MPs 1780–1784
British MPs 1784–1790
British MPs 1790–1796
British MPs 1796–1800
UK MPs 1801–1802
UK MPs 1802–1806
People from Wells, Somerset